Southern Sporades (Greek Nóties Sporádes) are Greek islands situated between the Cyclades and Turkey. They correspond to the Dodecanese plus a few northern islands (especially Samos and Ikaria). Also included by some geographers are the islands of Chios and Lesbos.

See also
Sporades

Islands of Greece
Dodecanese
Aegean islands